The Pink Slippers (German: Das rosa Pantöffelchen) is a 1927 German silent drama film directed by Franz Hofer and starring Hanni Reinwald, Ernst Rückert and Anna von Palen.

Cast
 Hanni Reinwald as Komtesse Lu von Saldern  
 Ernst Rückert as Fürst Karl-Heinz XVI. 
 Anna von Palen as Lus Mutter  
 Kurt Vespermann as Adjutant  
 Käte Schmidt-Samst as Christel - Försterstochter  
 Karl Harbacher as Hofmarschall  
 Gaston Briese as Minister  
 Hermann Picha as Minister  
 Eduard von Winterstein as Oberförster  
 Paul Graetz as Sally Löwenherz  
 Fritz Kampers as Bräutigam  
 Emmy Wyda as Tante Melusine 
 Olga Engl as Fürstinmutter  
 Fritz Beckmann as Onkel Armin  
 Carl Geppert as Minister  
 Erich Rank as Lus Vater 
 Gerdi Gerdt as Wally Schnappzahn

References

Bibliography
 Grange, William. Cultural Chronicle of the Weimar Republic. Scarecrow Press, 2008.

External links 
 

1927 films
Films of the Weimar Republic
German romantic drama films
German silent feature films
1927 romantic drama films
Films directed by Franz Hofer
German black-and-white films
Silent romantic drama films
1920s German films